This Is Who I Am may refer to:

"This Is Who I Am" (song), a 2009 CD single by Vanessa Amorosi
"This Is Who I Am", a 2008 song by Third Day from Revelation
This Is Who I Am (Heather Headley album), 2002
This Is Who I Am, a 2002 album by Jody McBrayer
This Is Who I Am (Salem Al Fakir album), 2007
This Is Who I Am (Kelly Price album), 2006
This Is Who I Am (Lena Katina album), 2014
This Is Who I Am (The Partland Brothers album), 2009
This Is Who I Am (short), a Disney Channel short series